Adimiron Black is the third full-length album by the Norwegian black metal band Gehenna.  It was their Moonfog Productions debut. This recording marked a different sound for the band, as this record has more of a heavier and death metal influence than their earlier recordings.

Track listing
"The Killing Kind" – 3:39
"Deadlights" – 5:38
"Adimiron Black" – 6:18
"Seeds of Man's Destruction" – 3:56
"Devils Work" – 7:41
"Slowly Being Poisoned" – 4:01
"Eater of the Dead" – 4:58

Credits
Sanrabb – Lead Guitar, Vocals
Dolgar – Rhythm Guitar, Vocals
E.N. Death – Bass
Damien – Keyboards
Blod – Drums
Sarcana – Keyboards on Admirion Black and Eater of the Dead

Additional information
The cover art on Adimiron Black is by Petter Hegre, a Norwegian photographer, most famous for his nude photography of women.

References

1998 albums
Gehenna (band) albums